Johan Kulhan (born 7 January 1992 in Amsterdam) is a Dutch professional footballer who currently plays as a right back for AFC  in the Dutch Tweede Divisie. He formerly played for Telstar and FC Emmen.

References

1992 births
Living people
Dutch footballers
SC Telstar players
FC Emmen players
Amsterdamsche FC players
Eerste Divisie players
Tweede Divisie players
Footballers from Amsterdam
Association football midfielders